Fire of Conscience is a 2010 Hong Kong-Chinese action film directed by Dante Lam and starring Leon Lai and Richie Jen.

Cast
Leon Lai as Detective Manfred
Richie Jen as Inspector Kee
Wang Baoqiang as Xiao Yong
Vivian Hsu as Ellen
Liu Kai-chi as Cheung On
Michelle Ye as May 
Charles Ying as Sam
Wilfred Lau as Hoi

Production
Director Dante Lam explained that the title of the film originates from the traditional fire dragon dance that Hong Kong residents used to practice to drive off pestilence and that he believes that there is pestilence in every human's soul that must be beaten out. To prepare for the action scenes, Leon Lai prepared for these scenes by exercising, jogging and swimming. Richie Jen stated that Lam wanted him to "lose weight to add more shadiness to my character. But before making any extra effort, I found myself thinner thanks to the hot weather and so many fighting scenes to shoot." Lai suggested that both Jen and he should sing as a duet for the theme song for the film. Jen stated that he "felt strange. But I liked the song instantly when Mark Lui finished it. We hope the song can lead the audience into a deeper understanding about the movie."

Release
Fire of Conscience premiered at the Hong Kong Film Festival on March 23, 2010. It received wide release in China and Hong Kong on April 1, 2010.
Fire of Conscience'''s debuted at fourth place at the Hong Kong box office and charted in Singapore, Malaysia, and New Zealand. The film stayed in the charts for four weeks in Hong Kong. The film grossed a total of US$526,017 in Hong Kong and US$806,708 world-wide.

Reception
Perry Lam of Muse magazine writes, 'in designing and executing the action scenes, [Lam] focuses too much on firepower and body count, and too little on their potential transgressive and transformational power.' Time Out Hong Kong gave the film a rating of three out of six stars noting that it was slightly less memorable than Dante Lam's previous film Beast Stalker.The Montreal Gazette gave a mixed review, saying that the film is "exciting, visually stunning movie, full of action and the bright punchy colours of a Sharp Quattron commercial. Unfortunately, it’s not much more than that." IFC gave a mixed review stating that "Lam's action is innovative and clever, but his approach to the characters is the exact opposite: predictable and obvious. We know these cops from so many previous movies. Not a single thing they do surprises us." The Hollywood Reporter described the film as "the loudest of the year" and "Any real thought about the nature of duty and the law is swept aside for action, action, and more action – which is average for Lam but still superior to most."The Montreal Mirror called the film a disappointment of the Toronto Film Festival, noting "incoherent plotting" and that "Lam obviously has some action chops, but he doesn’t exploit them nearly enough here."

References

External linksFire of Conscience at the Hong Kong Movie DatabaseFire of Conscience'' at the Hong Kong Cinemagic

2010 films
2010s Cantonese-language films
2010 action thriller films
Hong Kong action thriller films
Police detective films
Films directed by Dante Lam
Media Asia films
Films set in Hong Kong
Films shot in Hong Kong
2010s Hong Kong films